A Handful of Keys is an album of live performances by Fats Waller and His Rhythm, the only authorized live performances of the musician. It features previously unreleased live radio transcriptions originally broadcast in 1938.

Musicians
Fats Waller: piano and vocals
Herman Autrey: trumpet
Gene Sedric: clarinet and tenor saxophone
Al Casey: guitar
Cedric Wallace: bass
Slick Jones: drums

Producers
 Mike Ragogna
 Glenn Korman
 Will Friedwald

Includes liner notes by Will Friedwald.

Recording
Recorded live at NBC Studios and The Yacht Club, New York, New York in 1938.

Track list
"Ain’t Misbehavin’" (1:06)
"The Joint is Jumpin’" (3:00)
"Inside" (aka Inside This Heart of Mine) (3:01)
"I Had To Do It (2:15)
"E Flat Blues" (2:48)
"Hold My Hand" (2:28)
"Stop Beatin’ ‘Round the Mulberry Bush" (2:54)
"What’s The Matter With You" (2:31)
"Hallelujah" (1:34)
"What’s Your Name" (3:26)
"I Simply Adore You" (2:37)
"My Best Wishes" (2:29)
"Handful of Keys" (1:57)
"The Sheik of Araby" (3:16)
"The Flat Foot Floogie" (4:00)
"St. Louis Blues" (1:57)
"Pent Up In a Penthouse (3:34)
"Honeysuckle Rose (3:40)
"I Got Rhythm" (2:36)
"Some of These Days" (2:12)
"After You’ve Gone" (2:01)
"The Yacht Club Swing" (3:11)

Fats Waller albums